Kabhi Kabhii Pyaar Kabhi Kabhii Yaar is an Indian television dancing reality show that aired on Sony Entertainment Television from 9 July 2008 to 21 August 2008.

Hosts
 Rakshanda Khan
 Sachin Tyagi

Judges
 Mahesh Bhatt
 Ganesh Hegde
 Sameera Reddy

Contestants

Elimination chart

Contestants are in reverse chronological order of elimination.

The elimination is based on two of the lowest scores of the two bottom contestants who than choose to perform once more with their partner (Yaar or Pyaar) on the song they have performed earlier. Then judges decide which contestant has improved and the elimination takes place.

Weekly judges score

Episodes

Week 1: 9 and 10 July 2008

There was no elimination in the first week because it was an introduction when the contestants were introduced.

Week 2: 16 and 17 July 2008

Week 3: 23 and 24 July 2008

On Week 3, as usual before the elimination, two contestants from each trio have to perform so judges can decide which trio can stay and which is going to be eliminated. Hiten Tejwani and Nandini Singh performed and were eliminated since the other bottom trio scored higher points.

Week 4: 30 and 31 July 2008

The week 4 guest appearance was by Nikitin Dheer and Shweta Bharadwaj to promote the movie Mission Istanbul.

In the 30 July episode, Vishal Singh's jodi got eliminated due to Dimple's forgetting her steps and blanking out on stage. Because of this, the jodi got a low score from judges, especially Ganesh Hegde who gave only 1 score; the trio being eliminated.

Week 5: 6 and 7 August 2008

Week 5 was different from the other weeks. This time it was bottom 3 instead of bottom 2. Jatin-Priya-Shalini were ousted from the show. Kashmera-Mukul had the worst performance according to Mahesh Bhatt. Mridul's team wants Kashmeera's team to come in finals with them.

Week 6: 13 and 14 August 2008

Throughout the show, the trio who received the lowest score was eliminated. This week the judges chose Kashmira's team to be in the final despite having the low score because of their good performances throughout the show. Mridul's team was eliminated even after being in the second position this week.

Grand Finale — Week 7: 20 and 21 August 2008

The grand finale was in week 7, where all the eliminated contestant's once again performed with their partners' on the stage for the last time. The celebrity guests who participated in the finale were Tusshar Kapoor and Rajpal Yadav who also came to promote their forthcoming movie C Kkompany.

There were three rounds to the finale: the first was that both of the co-contestants' (yaar and pyaar) had to perform together, the main contestant had to choose from their yaar or pyaar to perform in the second round, and in the last round, the trio had to perform together. Once all three rounds were completed, the score was added, and whichever trio received the highest score was declared as the winner.

References

External links
 Official site on SET India
 Article on Televisionpoint.com
 Article on Tellychakker.com

Balaji Telefilms television series
Indian reality television series
Sony Entertainment Television original programming